AdaBoost, short for Adaptive Boosting, is a statistical classification meta-algorithm formulated by Yoav Freund and Robert Schapire in 1995, who won the 2003 Gödel Prize for their work. It can be used in conjunction with many other types of learning algorithms to improve performance. The output of the other learning algorithms ('weak learners') is combined into a weighted sum that represents the final output of the boosted classifier. Usually, AdaBoost is presented for binary classification, although it can be generalized to multiple classes or bounded intervals on the real line.

AdaBoost is adaptive in the sense that subsequent weak learners are tweaked in favor of those instances misclassified by previous classifiers. In some problems it can be less susceptible to the overfitting problem than other learning algorithms. The individual learners can be weak, but as long as the performance of each one is slightly better than random guessing, the final model can be proven to converge to a strong learner.

Although AdaBoost is typically used to combine weak base learners (such as decision stumps), it has been shown that it can also effectively combine strong base learners (such as deep decision trees), producing an even more accurate model.

Every learning algorithm tends to suit some problem types better than others, and typically has many different parameters and configurations to adjust before it achieves optimal performance on a dataset. AdaBoost (with decision trees as the weak learners) is often referred to as the best out-of-the-box classifier. When used with decision tree learning, information gathered at each stage of the AdaBoost algorithm about the relative 'hardness' of each training sample is fed into the tree growing algorithm such that later trees tend to focus on harder-to-classify examples.

Training
AdaBoost refers to a particular method of training a boosted classifier. A boosted classifier is a classifier of the form

where each  is a weak learner that takes an object  as input and returns a value indicating the class of the object. For example, in the two-class problem, the sign of the weak learner's output identifies the predicted object class and the absolute value gives the confidence in that classification. Similarly, the -th classifier is positive if the sample is in a positive class and negative otherwise.

Each weak learner produces an output hypothesis  which fixes a prediction  for each sample in the training set. At each iteration , a weak learner is selected and assigned a coefficient  such that the total training error  of the resulting -stage boosted classifier is minimized.

Weighting
At each iteration of the training process, a weight  is assigned to each sample in the training set equal to the current error  on that sample. These weights can be used in the training of the weak learner. For instance, decision trees can be grown which favor the splitting of sets of samples with large weights.

Derivation
This derivation follows Rojas (2009):

Suppose we have a data set  where each item  has an associated class , and a set of weak classifiers  each of which outputs a classification  for each item. After the -th iteration our boosted classifier is a linear combination of the weak classifiers of the form:

,

At the -th iteration we want to extend this to a better boosted classifier by adding another weak classifier , with another weight :

To determine the desired weight  that minimizes  with the  that we just determined, we differentiate:

Setting this to zero and solving for  yields:

We calculate the weighted error rate of the weak classifier to be , so it follows that:

which is the negative logit function multiplied by 0.5.

Note: This derivation only applies when , though it can be a good starting guess in other cases, such as when the weak learner is biased, has multiple leaves or is some other function .

Statistical understanding of boosting

However, the exponential increase in the error for sample  as  increases. resulting in excessive weights being assigned to outliers.

One feature of the choice of exponential error function is that the error of the final additive model is the product of the error of each stage, that is, . Thus it can be seen that the weight update in the AdaBoost algorithm is equivalent to recalculating the error on  after each stage.

There is a lot of flexibility allowed in the choice of loss function. As long as the loss function is monotonic and continuously differentiable, the classifier is always driven toward purer solutions. Zhang (2004) provides a loss function based on least squares, a modified Huber loss function:

This function is more well-behaved than LogitBoost for  close to 1 or -1, does not penalise ‘overconfident’ predictions, unlike unmodified least squares, and only penalises samples misclassified with confidence greater than 1 linearly, as opposed to quadratically or exponentially, and is thus less susceptible to the effects of outliers.

Boosting as gradient descent

Boosting can be seen as minimization of a convex loss function over a convex set of functions. Specifically, the loss being minimized by AdaBoost is the exponential loss

,

whereas LogitBoost performs logistic regression, minimizing

.

In the gradient descent analogy, the output of the classifier for each training point is considered a point  in n-dimensional space, where each axis corresponds to a training sample, each weak learner  corresponds to a vector of fixed orientation and length, and the goal is to reach the target point  (or any region where the value of loss function  is less than the value at that point), in the fewest steps. Thus AdaBoost algorithms perform either Cauchy (find  with the steepest gradient, choose  to minimize test error) or Newton (choose some target point, find  that brings  closest to that point) optimization of training error.

Example algorithm (Discrete AdaBoost)
With:
 Samples 
 Desired outputs 
 Initial weights  set to 
 Error function 
 Weak learners 
For  in :
 Choose :
 Find weak learner  that minimizes , the weighted sum error for misclassified points 
 Choose 
 Add to ensemble:
 
 Update weights:
 Renormalize  such that 
(Note: It can be shown that  at every step, which can simplify the calculation of the new weights.)

Variants

Real AdaBoost
The output of decision trees is a class probability estimate , the probability that  is in the positive class.
.
Thus, rather than multiplying the output of the entire tree by some fixed value, each leaf node is changed to output half the logit transform of its previous value.

LogitBoost

LogitBoost represents an application of established logistic regression techniques to the AdaBoost method.

 

where

 
 
 

As p approaches either 1 or 0, the value of  becomes very small and the z term, which is large for misclassified samples, can become numerically unstable, due to machine precision rounding errors. This can be overcome by enforcing some limit on the absolute value of z and the minimum value of w

Gentle AdaBoost
While previous boosting algorithms choose  greedily, minimizing the overall test error as much as possible at each step, GentleBoost features a bounded step size.  is chosen to minimize , and no further coefficient is applied. Empirical observations about the good performance of GentleBoost appear to back up Schapire and Singer's remark that allowing excessively large values of  can lead to poor generalization performance.

Early Termination
A technique for speeding up processing of boosted classifiers, early termination refers to only testing each potential object with as many layers of the final classifier necessary to meet some confidence threshold, speeding up computation for cases where the class of the object can easily be determined. One such scheme is the object detection framework introduced by Viola and Jones: in an application with significantly more negative samples than positive, a cascade of separate boost classifiers is trained, the output of each stage biased such that some acceptably small fraction of positive samples is mislabeled as negative, and all samples marked as negative after each stage are discarded. If 50% of negative samples are filtered out by each stage, only a very small number of objects would pass through the entire classifier, reducing computation effort. This method has since been generalized, with a formula provided for choosing optimal thresholds at each stage to achieve some desired false positive and false negative rate.

In the field of statistics, where AdaBoost is more commonly applied to problems of moderate dimensionality, early stopping is used as a strategy to reduce overfitting. A validation set of samples is separated from the training set, performance of the classifier on the samples used for training is compared to performance on the validation samples, and training is terminated if performance on the validation sample is seen to decrease even as performance on the training set continues to improve.

Totally corrective algorithms
For steepest descent versions of AdaBoost, where  is chosen at each layer t to minimize test error, the next layer added is said to be maximally independent of layer t: it is unlikely to choose a weak learner t+1 that is similar to learner t. However, there remains the possibility that t+1 produces similar information to some other earlier layer. Totally corrective algorithms, such as LPBoost, optimize the value of every coefficient after each step, such that new layers added are always maximally independent of every previous layer. This can be accomplished by backfitting, linear programming or some other method.

Pruning
Pruning is the process of removing poorly performing weak classifiers to improve memory and execution-time cost of the boosted classifier. The simplest methods, which can be particularly effective in conjunction with totally corrective training, are weight- or margin-trimming: when the coefficient, or the contribution to the total test error, of some weak classifier falls below a certain threshold, that classifier is dropped. Margineantu & Dietterich suggested an alternative criterion for trimming: weak classifiers should be selected such that the diversity of the ensemble is maximized. If two weak learners produce very similar outputs, efficiency can be improved by removing one of them and increasing the coefficient of the remaining weak learner.

See also
 Bootstrap aggregating
 CoBoosting
 BrownBoost
 Gradient boosting

References

Further reading

  original paper of Yoav Freund and Robert E.Schapire where AdaBoost is first introduced.
  On the margin explanation of boosting algorithm.
  On the doubt about margin explanation of boosting.

Classification algorithms
Ensemble learning